Edward Dowson (17 February 1838 – 29 April 1922) was an English cricketer who played for Surrey between 1856 and 1870 as a gentleman cricketer. He also captained Surrey in 1866. A right-hand bat, he scored 1,927 runs at a batting average of 16.90. His son, Edward Maurice Dowson, played over one hundred matches for Surrey and also Cambridge University cricket team, and his great-great-grandson Ed Carpenter played briefly for Durham MCC University.

References
Notes

Sources
 
 

1838 births
1922 deaths
People from Camberwell
Surrey cricketers
Surrey cricket captains
Gentlemen of the South cricketers
Surrey Club cricketers
Gentlemen cricketers
Southgate cricketers
English cricketers